The 2006–07 FAW Premier Cup was the tenth season of the tournament since its founding in 1997. The New Saints were the eventual winners, beating Newport County 1–0 in the final to win the competition for the first time in the club's history.
Losing semi-final teams each receive £25,000.
The losing finalists receive £50,000 with the winners receiving £100,000.

First round

Second round

Later rounds

Final

References

FAW Premier Cup 2006/7

2006-07
2006–07 in Welsh football cups